

English country house fountains

Fountains became a decorative feature of the English country house as early as the end of the 17th century.  These baroque fountains were influenced by the fountains of the Italian Renaissance garden and the Garden à la française, particularly the fountains of Versailles.   Chatsworth House in Derbyshire featured a cascade and fountains (1696-1703) in the style of French baroque gardens.  It had a seahorse fountain and a willow tree fountain, which sprayed water on unsuspecting visitors.

In 1843 the Duke of Devonshire, the owner of Chatworth House, learned that the Tsar Nicholas of Russia  was planning to visit his home.  To mark the occasion, the Duke commissioned his gardener Joseph Paxton to construct the world's highest fountain on his estate.  Paxton built an eight-acre lake as a reservoir for the fountain, 350 feet above the level of the fountain, to provide water pressure.  The Emperor Fountain was finished in just six months, and could jet water 296 feet high.  Unfortunately the Tsar never came to see fountain, but it still functions today.

In the nineteenth century, the development of steam engines allowed the construction of more dramatic fountains. In the middle of the century the Earl of Stamford built the Great Fountain, Enville, which jetted water 150 feet above the surface of a lake on his estate.   He used two steam engines to pump water to a reservoir at the top of the hill above his estate.  The fountain could spout water for several minutes, until the reservoir was empty.

In the early 21st Century, Lord Neidpath (now Earl of Wemyss and March) commissioned a giant, gravity-fed fountain at his family's ancestral home of Stanway House, in the Cotswolds.

London fountains

In the 19th century, major European cities, led by London and Paris, began to use aqueducts, artesian wells  and steam pumps to supply drinking water directly to homes.   Fountains gradually ceased to be sources of drinking water and became public monuments in city squares and parks, honouring national heroes and events.

The fountains in Trafalgar Square were not part of the original design of the square, which was created beginning in 1826 to commemorate the victory of Lord Nelson over the fleet of Napoleon Bonaparte 1805.  The fountains were added in 1845 by architect Charles Barry, famous for designing the Houses of Parliament,  to break up the vast open space of the square and also to reduce the space available for unruly street demonstrations. The fountains were powered by a steam engine behind the National Gallery, which pumped water that came from an Artesian Well.

The original fountains were replaced in 1938-47 with two new fountains designed by Sir Edwin Lutyens, with sculptures by Sir Charles Wheeler and William McMillian,  as monuments to two British naval heroes of the First World War, Lord John Jellicoe and Lord David Beatty. They were rebuilt again, with new pumps and lighting, in 2009.

The Shaftesbury Memorial Fountain in Piccadilly Circus, London by Alfred Gilbert, features an aluminium statue of Anteros representing "The Angel of Christian Charity."  It was built in 1893 to honour the British philanthropist Lord Shaftesbury, but instead it scandalised Londoners, who thought it was a statue of Eros.

Exposition fountains

In the 19th century,  international expositions in London and Paris introduced fountains using new materials and technologies.  The Crystal Fountain was the first of these fountains.  Designed by Follett Osler, it was the world's first glass fountain, made of four tons of pure crystal glass.  It was displayed in the central court of the Crystal Palace of the London Great Exhibition of 1851.  It was destroyed by fire, along with the Crystal Palace, in 1936.  The Art Journal Illustrated Catalogue of the Great Exhibition wrote in 1851 that the fountain was "perhaps the most striking object in the exhibition; the lightness and beauty, as well as the perfect novelty of the design, have rendered it the theme of admiration with all visitors.  The ingenuity with which this has been effected is very perfect; it is supported by bars of iron, which are so completely embedded in the glass shafts, as to be invisible, and in no degree interfering with the purity and crystalline effect of the whole object.

Gallery of notable fountains in the United Kingdom

Bibliography
Marilyn Symmes (editor), Fountains- Splash and Spectacle - Water and Design from the Renaissance to the Present. Thames and Hudson, in association with the Cooper-Hewillt National Design Museum of the Smithsonian Institution. (1988). .

References